Goniodelphis hudsoni is an extinct iniid river dolphin known from the waters of Florida during the Miocene ~14.9—11.5 through 9.1—8.7 Ma (AEO).

The fossil specimens were found in just four phosphate mines in Polk County, Florida. These mines were: 
American Agricultural Chemical Company (Serravallian)
Fort Green (Hemphillian)
Payne Creek (Hemphillian)
Gardinier (Zanclean)

Taxonomy
Goniodelphis  was named by Allen (1941). Its type is Goniodelphis hudsoni. It was considered monophyletic by Mark D. Uhen, Ph.D. of George Mason University in 2010. It was assigned to Delphinidae  by Carroll (1988); and to Iniidae  by Allen (1941), Kellogg (1944), de Muizon (1988), Morgan (1994), McKenna and Bell (1997), Hamilton et al. (2001), Fordyce and de Muizon (2001), Uhen et al. (2008) and Mark D. Uhen.

References

River dolphins
Miocene mammals of North America
Prehistoric toothed whales
Miocene cetaceans
Prehistoric cetacean genera
Fossil taxa described in 1941
Serravallian first appearances
Zanclean extinctions